Sailing (as Windsurfing) at the 2012 Asian Beach Games was held from 17 June 2012 to 21 June 2012 at the Fengxiang Beach in Haiyang, China.

Medalists

Medal table

Results

Men's Techno 293
17–21 June

Women's Techno 293
17–21 June

References 

Official Site

2012
2012 Asian Beach Games events
Asian Beach Games
Sailing competitions in China